Dolbino is a rural locality (a selo) in Belgorodsky District, Belgorod Oblast, Russia. The population was 516 as of 2010. There are 11 streets.

Geography 
Dolbino is located 4 km southwest of Maysky (the district's administrative centre) by road. Vesyolaya Lopan is the nearest rural locality.

References 

Rural localities in Belgorodsky District
Belgorodsky Uyezd